Carathis gortynoides is a moth of the family Erebidae first described by Augustus Radcliffe Grote in 1866. It is found on Cuba.

References

Phaegopterina
Moths described in 1866
Endemic fauna of Cuba